The .quebec domain is a new GeoTLD and Community Priority Application that was proposed to ICANN's New gTLD Program by PointQuébec, a non-profit organisation. The organisation aims to improve the businesses, culture, tourism, and online identity of Quebec and the Canadians through the .quebec TLD. According to the PointQuébec organisation, .quebec will allow all Quebecers to register their domain names under .quebec.

PointQuébec's application for the GeoTLD was approved, and was delegated to the Root Zone on 16 April 2014. The application was supported by the National Assembly of Quebec and other cultural, technical, and economic institutions in the province. The application received support from all political parties in the legislature. It received "substantial financial support from the Government of Quebec", including a $185,000 loan, and is a not-for profit organisation. The organisation will verify legitimate registrations via statements of intent through a post-verification registration system. Quebec officially launched on November 18, 2014.

Michel Philibert, a spokesman for PointQuebec, stated “We have our own culture, and we have our own way of doing things, and we want to also affirm our presence on the web”

Along with TLDs such as .africa, .cat, .paris, .quebec and other new TLDs fall into the new category of GeoTLDs. The issue of new top level domains in general and .quebec in particular has been discussed at various ICANN-Meetings since 2005.

Signing of contract 
On 19 December 2013, PointQuébec received a registry agreement signed by ICANN for .quebec after passing all the required processes needed to become a registry operator for the string.

Delegation and availability 
.quebec was delegated to the Root Zone of the DNS on 16 April 2014, completing the successful application for the string.

See also 
 List of Internet top-level domains
 Top-level domain
 Internet in Canada
 .ca
 .qc.ca
 GeoTLD

References

External links
Register for .QUEBEC

2014 establishments in Quebec
Computer-related introductions in 2014
Mass media in Quebec
Internet in Canada
Sponsored top-level domains